Imperial Chancellor may refer to:

 Chancellor (China)
 Archchancellor (Holy Roman Empire)
 Imperial Chancellor (Germany)